The Sellersburg Group is a geologic group in Kentucky. It preserves fossils dating back to the Devonian period.

See also

 List of fossiliferous stratigraphic units in Kentucky

References
 

Geologic groups of Kentucky